Damir Salimov (19 July 1937 – 28 March 2019) was an Uzbek film director who was credited with introducing animation to Uzbekistan in 1965, when he directed and produced the animated puppet film В квадрате 6х6. He was also a prominent figure in the development of hand-drawn animation in Uzbekistan in the 1970s.

Salimov studied at State Institute of Cinematography (VGIK).

Filmography
1972: Gory zovut
1977: Ozornik
1980: Leningradtsy, deti moi...
1987: Smysl zhizni

Notes

External links
 

1937 births
2019 deaths
Soviet film directors
Uzbekistani film directors
Mass media people from Tashkent
Communist Party of the Soviet Union members